Montther "Monti" Mohsen (born June 13, 2000) is a Canadian professional soccer player who plays as a left-back for Palestinian side Shabab Al-Khalil SC.

Club career

Early career
Mohsen began playing organized soccer at age six for local club Ottawa St. Anthony SC. In 2017, he played for Ottawa Internationals SC.

In 2017, Mohsen represented Team Ontario at the 2017 Canada Summer Games and scored the winning goal in the final against Team Alberta.

Ottawa Fury
In April 2017, Mohsen began training with the Ottawa Fury on a non-contract basis. In February 2018 he went on trial with Ottawa and subsequently signed his first professional contract with the club on March 16, 2018. He made his professional debut the next day, playing the first 45 minutes of a 4-1 loss to the Charlotte Independence. After only one appearance Mohsen would be released by the Fury in August 2018.

Sigma FC
Upon his release from Ottawa, Mohsen joined Sigma FC of League1 Ontario. That season, he made six appearances for Sigma.

Forge FC
Mohsen joined Canadian Premier League club Forge FC on March 2, 2019. He made his league debut on May 29, entering in the 87th minute of a 2–0 win over FC Edmonton. Mohsen scored his first goal for Forge on September 4 against Pacific FC.

Shabab Al-Khalil SC
In July, 2022, Mohsen signed with West Bank Premier League club Shabab Al-Khalil SC.

International career
In April 2017, Mohsen was called up to the Canadian U17 team for the 2017 CONCACAF U-17 Championship, but did not appear in the tournament.

Honours

Club
Forge FC
Canadian Premier League: 2019, 2020

References

External links
2017 Canada Games profile

2000 births
Living people
Association football defenders
Soccer players from Ottawa
Canadian soccer players
Canadian people of Iraqi descent
Canadian people of Syrian descent
Ottawa Fury FC players
Forge FC players
USL Championship players
League1 Ontario players
Canadian Premier League players
Ottawa South United players
Sigma FC players